Dadah Is Death is a 1988 Australian film based on the Barlow and Chambers execution in Malaysia in 1986.

It was a 2-part mini series running 2 hours per part.

Cast 

 Julie Christie	  ... 	Barbara Barlow
 Hugo Weaving	  ... 	Geoffrey Chambers
 John Polson	  ... 	Kevin Barlow
 Mouche Phillips     ...   Michelle Barlow
 Sarah Jessica Parker ... 	Rachel Goldman
 Kerry Armstrong	  ... 	Shawn Burton
 Robin Ramsay	  ... 	Wilf Barlow
 Victor Banerjee	  ... 	Karpal Singh
 Shapoor Batliwalla	  ... 	Nagendran
 Guy Stone                  ...  John
 David Bookalil		
 David Bracks		
 Clive Carlin		
 Liddy Clark	  ... 	Gilda Rickman
 Robert Davis	  ... 	David West
 Neela Dey		
 David Field
 Narian Singh           ... Prison Superintendent

Other names
The film is also known as
Barlow and Chambers: A Long Way from Home
Deadly Decision

References

External links

1988 films
Australian crime drama films
Films set in Malaysia
Films about capital punishment
Crime films based on actual events
Films directed by Jerry London
1988 crime drama films
Films scored by Fred Karlin
1980s English-language films
1980s Australian films